Paratanaidae is a family of crustaceans belonging to the order Tanaidacea.

Genera

Genera:
 Acallocheirus Bird & Bamber, 2013
 Aparatanais Bird & Bamber, 2013
 Atemtanais Bird, 2011

References

Tanaidacea
Crustacean families